The 1985 edition of Copa Libertadores was won by Argentinos Juniors, of Argentina for the first time, after defeating América of Colombia in a penalty shootout, following a playoff game after the two-legged final finished level.

Group stage
Club Atlético Independiente were given a bye to the second round as holders.

Group A

First Place playoff
Sept 11: Argentinos 3-1 Ferro Carril Oeste

Group B

Group C

Group D

Group E

Semi-finals

Group 1

Group 2

Finals

|}

Playoff

Champion

External links
 Copa Libertadores 1985 by Karel Stokkermans at RSSSF
 Colombian clubs in Copa Libertadores by Frank Ballasteros at RSSSF

1
Copa Libertadores seasons